The 2019 Dartford Borough Council election took place on 2 May 2019 to elect members of the Dartford Borough Council in England. It was held on the same day as other local elections.

Summary

Election result

|-

Ward results

Bean & Village Park

Brent

Bridge

Burnham

Darenth

Ebbsfleet

Greenhithe & Knockhall

Heath

Joydens Wood

Longfield, New Barn & Southfleet

Maypole & Layton Cross

Newtown

Princes

Stone Castle

Stone House

Swanscombe

Temple Hill

Town

West Hill

Wilmington, Sutton-at-Hone & Hawley

By-elections

Maypole & Leyton Cross

Wilmington, Sutton-at-Hone & Hawley

References

2019 English local elections
May 2019 events in the United Kingdom
2019
2010s in Kent